This is a list of supermarket chains in Hungary.

Grocery stores

Hypermarkets and cash & carry stores

Auchan

 Budakalász (Lake Omszk)
 Budaörs (Korzó)
 Budapest, Aquincum Óbuda
 Csömör (Liget)
 Debrecen (Cívis)
 Dunakeszi
 Fót
 Kecskemét
 Maglód
 Miskolc
 Miskolc-South (Csabai kapu)
 Solymár (Pilis)
 Budapest, Savoya Park
 Budapest, Soroksár (M5)
 Szeged (Fehér-tó)
 Székesfehérvár (Korona)
 Szigetszentmiklós (Sziget)
 Szolnok (Szandai-rét)
 Törökbálint

Interspar (Spar)

 Budapest, Bécsi út 154.
 Budapest, Sibrik Miklós út 30.
 Budapest, Kerepesi út 61.
 Budapest, Október 23-a utca 8-10.
 Budapest, Üllői út 201.
 Budapest, Széchenyi utca 1.
 Szentendre
 Érd
 Diósd
 Dunaújváros
 Tatabánya
 Miskolc
 Ózd
 Debrecen
 Nyíregyháza, László utca 8.
 Nyíregyháza, Korányi Frigyes utca
 Szolnok
 Gyula, Hungary
 Hódmezővásárhely
 Szekszárd
 Pécs, Siklósi út 37.
 Pécs, Bajcsy-Zsilinszky utca 11.
 Székesfehérvár, Budai út 41.
 Székesfehérvár, Balaton út 44-46.
 Veszprém
 Keszthely
 Pápa
 Nagykanizsa
 Zalaegerszeg
 Győr, Fehérvári út 3.
 Győr, Budai út 1.
 Sopron
 Szombathely
 Tata
 Kaposvár

Metro

 Budakalász
 Budaörs
 Debrecen
 Budapest, (Ferencváros)
 Győr
 Kecskemét
 Budapest, (Kelet-Pest)
 Miskolc
 Nyíregyháza
 Pécs
 Szeged
 Székesfehérvár
 Szombathely

Tesco

 Ajka
 Arena Plaza / Bp., VIII.ker.
 Baja
 Balassagyarmat
 Balatonboglár
 Balatonfüred
Bécsi út / Bp., III.ker.
 Békéscsaba
 Berettyóújfalu
 Bicske,
 Bonyhád
 Budakeszi
 Budaörs
Campona / Bp., XXII.ker.
 Cegléd
Csepel / Bp., XXI.ker.
 Csorna
 Dabas
 extra Debrecen
 extra Debrecen Repülőtér
 Dombóvár
 Dunaharaszti
 Dunakeszi
 Dunakeszi – Fót
 Dunaújváros
 Eger
 Érd
 Esztergom
extra Fogarasi út / Bp., XIV.ker.
Garam utca / Bp., IV.ker.
 Gödöllő
 Gyöngyös
 Győr
 Gyula
 Hajdúszoboszló
 Hatvan
 Hódmezővásárhely
 Jászberény
 Kalocsa
 Kaposvár
 Karcag
 Kazincbarcika
 Kecskemét
 Kecskemét – Target Center
 Keszthely
 Kiskőrös,
 Kiskunfélegyháza
 Kiskunhalas
 Kisvárda
Köki Terminál / Bp., XIX.ker.
 Komárom
 Komló
 Körmend
 Kőszeg
 Makó
 Marcali
Market Central Ferihegy / Vecsés
 Mátészalka
 Mezőkövesd
 extra Miskolc
 Miskolc – Avas
 Mohács
 Monor
 Mosonmagyaróvár
 Nagyatád
 Nagykanizsa
 Nagykőrös
 Nyírbátor
 Nyíregyháza
 Orosháza
 Oroszlány
 Ózd
 Paks
 Pápa
 Pécs
 Pécs – Budai Vám
 Pécs – Kertváros
Pesterzsébet / Bp., XX.ker.
Pesti út / Bp., XVII.ker.
Pólus / Bp., XV.ker.
 Salgótarján
 Sárbogárd
 Sárvár
 Sátoraljaújhely
 Siklós
 Siófok
 Sopron
Soroksári út / Bp., IX.ker.
 Szarvas
 Százhalombatta
 extra Szeged
 Szeged – Móraváros
 Székesfehérvár
 Székesfehérvár – Palota
 Szekszárd
 Szentes
 Szerencs
 Szigetvár
 extra Szolnok
 Szombathely
 Tapolca
 Tata
 Tatabánya
 Tiszafüred
 Tiszaújváros
 Tököl
Újbuda / Bp., XI.ker.
 Vác
extra Váci út / Bp., XIII.ker.
 Várpalota
 Veszprém
 Zalaegerszeg

Gallery

Discount supermarkets

Aldi 

 Ajka
 Baja
 Balatonalmádi
 Balatonfüred (2x)
Fürdő utca 31.
Petőfi Sándor utca 80.
 Balatonlelle
 Békéscsaba
 Bonyhád
 Budakalász
 Budakeszi
 Budaörs (2x)
Kandó Kálmán u. 2.
Malomkő u. 3.
 Budapest (34x)
II., Pasaréti út 98.
III., Huszti út 33.
III., Rákóczi út 38.
IV., Óceánárok u. 3-5.
V., Kossuth Lajos u. 13.
V., Báthory u. 8.
VIII., Rákóczi út 65.
IX., Tűzoltó u. 10-16.
IX., Vámház körút 1-3.
X., Kerepesi út 73.
XI., Kondorosi út 7.
XI., Soproni út 60.
XI., Hunyadi János út 19.
XI., Rétköz u. 10/b.
XIII., Rokolya u. 1-13.
XIII., Pannónia utca 59-63.
XIII., Petneházy utca 12.
XIV., Szugló u. 60-62.
XV., Régi Fóti út 64.
XV., Erdőkerülő u. 47.
XV., Késmárk utca 10.
XVI., Bökényföldi út 102.
XVII., Pesti út 237/p
XVII., Pesti út 2.
XVIII., Cziffra György utca 7.
XIX., Szalay u. 7-17.
XIX., Hofherr Albert u. 38-40.
XIX., Üllői út 280.
XX., Köves út 9.
XXI., II. Rákóczi F. út 154-170.
XXI., Szent Imre tér 6-8.
XXII., Háros u. 11.
XXII., Nagytétényi út 145-147.
XXIII., Haraszti út 32/b
 Cegléd
 Dabas
 Debrecen (4x)
Kishatár utca 9/A
Ozmán utca 1.
Ötvenhatosok tere 5/b.
Vincellér utca 5.
 Dunaföldvár
 Dunaharaszti
 Dunakeszi
 Dunaújváros (2x)
Eszperantó út 4.
Kandó Kálmán tér 10.
 Esztergom
 Érd
 Fót
 Gárdony
 Gödöllő
 Győr (4x)
Szauter Ferenc u. 3/C
Csipkegyári út 11.
Fehérvári út 5/A
Malomszéki utca 11.
 Hajdúböszörmény
 Hajdúszoboszló
 Halásztelek
 Hatvan
 Hódmezővásárhely
 Jászberény
 Kalocsa
 Kaposvár (2x)
Árpád utca 31.
Petőfi utca 56.
 Karcag
 Kazincbarcika
 Kecskemét (3x)
Izsáki út 69.
Rákóczi út 13/A.
Szt. István krt. 30.
 Kerepes
 Keszthely
 Kiskunhalas
 Kisvárda
 Miskolc (2x)
Kiss Ernő utca 13/A
Pesti út
 Mohács
 Monor
 Mosonmagyaróvár
 Mór
 Nyíregyháza (3x)
Kállói út 16/C
Pazonyi út 40.
Törzs utca 2.
 Paks
 Pápa
 Pécs (3x)
Zsolnay Vilmos utca 48.
Árnyas utca 25.
Tüzér utca 5/A
 Piliscsaba
 Siófok
 Solymár
 Sopron (2x)
Ágfalvi út 4/A
Győri út 45.
 Szántód
 Szigetszentmiklós
 Szeged (2x)
Kossuth Lajos sgt. 119.
Katona József utca 89.
 Szentendre
 Szentes
 Székesfehérvár (3x)
Holland fasor 1.
Jancsár köz 1-3.
Szt. Flórián krt. 11.
 Szigetszentmiklós
 Szolnok
 Szombathely (2x)
Demeter utca 2.
Szent Gellért utca 49.
 Tapolca
 Tatabánya
 Törökbálint
 Vác
 Vecsés
 Veszprém (2x)
Dornyai Béla u. 5.
Észak-keleti útgyűrű 6.
 Zalaegerszeg

Lidl 

 Agárd
 Ajka
 Baja
 Balatonlelle
 Balassagyarmat
 Balmazújváros
 Barcs
 Bátonyterenye
 Berettyóújfalu
 Békés
 Békéscsaba
 Bicske
 Bonyhád
 Budapest (32x)
III. Bécsi út 325-337.
III. Huszti út 20.
III. Szentendrei út 251.
IV. Megyeri út 53.
VI. Bajcsy-Zsilinszky út 61.
VI. Király u. 112.
VIII. Hungária körút 26.
VIII. Leonardo da Vinci u. 23.
VIII. Teleki tér 1.
IX. Gubacsi út 34.
IX. Lobogó u. 12.
X. Ceglédi út 1-3.
X. Maglódi út 17.
X. Sibrik Miklós út 30.
XI. Bartók Béla út 47.
XIII. Béke tér 2-4.
XIV. Mogyoródi út 23-29.
XV. Erdőkerülő út 36.
XV. Régi Fóti u. 1.
XVI. János u. 196.
XVI. Újszász u. 47/B
XVII. Pesti út 2.
XVII. Pesti út 237/H
XVIII. Cziffra György u. 115.
XVIII. Margó Tivadar u. 83.
XVIII. Nagykorösi út 35.
XVIII. Üllői út 379-381.
XIX. Báthory u. 6.
XXI. Ady Endre út 58.
XXII. Nagytétényi út 216.
XXIII. Ciklámen u. 3.
XXIII. Haraszti út 34-36.
 Cegléd
 Csongrád
 Csorna
 Csurgó
 Debrecen (2x)
Derék utca
Faraktár utca 58.
 Dombóvár
 Dorog
 Dunaharaszti
 Dunakeszi
 Dunaújváros
 Eger
 Enying
 Esztergom (2x)
Bánomi út
Dobogokői út
 Érd
 Fonyód
 Gödöllő
 Gyomaendrőd
 Gyöngyös
 Győr (4x)
Jereváni utca 42.
Mécs László utca
Szeszgyár utca 6.
Tihanyi Árpád utca 9.
 Gyula
 Hajdúböszörmény
 Hajdúhadház
 Hajdúnánás
 Hatvan
 Heves
 Hódmezővásárhely
 Jászberény
 Kalocsa
 Kaposvár (3x)
Bereczk Sándor u. 2.
Előd vezér u. 3.
Füredi út
 Kazincbarcika
 Kecskemét
 Keszthely (2x)
Sopron utca 43.
Tapolcai utca 45/A
 Kiskőrös
 Kiskunfélegyháza
 Kiskunhalas
 Kistarcsa
 Kisújszállás
 Kisvárda
 Komárom
 Komló
 Körmend
 Makó
 Marcali
 Martfű
 Mezőkovácsháza
 Mezőkövesd
 Mezőtúr
 Miskolc (3x)
Csermőkei út 207.
Kiss Ernő utca 13/B
Pesti út 5.
 Mohács
 Monor
 Mosonmagyaróvár
 Mór
 Nagyatád
 Nagykanizsa
 Nagykáta
 Nagykőrös
 Nyíregyháza (2x)
Debreceni út 106/C
Pazonyi út 37/A
 Orosháza
 Oroszlány
 Ózd
 Paks
 Pápa
 Pécs (4x)
Lahti utca 45.
Lázár Vilmos utca 10.
Puskin tér 22.
Siklósi út 52/A
 Püspökladány
 Ráckeve
 Sárbogárd
 Sárvár
 Sátoraljaújhely
 Siklós
 Siófok
 Solt
 Sopron (2x)
Bánfalvi út 12.
Lófuttató utca 4.
 Szarvas
 Szeged (2x)
Makkosházi körút 21.
Szabadkai út 1/C
 Szeghalom
 Szekszárd
 Szentendre
 Szentes
 Szerencs
 Székesfehérvár (3x)
Balatoni út 21.
Farkasvermi út
Mártírok út 11.
 Szigetvár
 Szigetszentmiklós
 Szolnok (2x)
Széchenyi körút 4/B
Délibáb utca 4-6.
 Szombathely (3x)
Kenyérvíz utca 2.
Verseny utca 30.
Zanati út
 Tamási
 Tapolca
 Tatabánya (2x)
Győri út 31.
Szent Borbála út 31.
 Tiszafüred
 Tiszaújváros
 Törökszentmiklós
 Újfehértó
 Vác (2x)
Bolgár u. 1.
Naszály utca 20.
 Várpalota
 Vecsés
 Veszprém (2x)
Cholnoky Jenő u. 29/1.
Észak Keleti útgyűrű 2.
Zalaegerszeg (2x)
 Átkötő utca 3.
 Platán sor 6/A

Penny Market 

 Abony
 Ajka
 Albertirsa
 Alsónémedi
 Aszód
 Ács
 Baja
 Balassagyarmat
 Balatonalmádi
 Balatonfüred
 Balatonlelle
 Balmazújváros
 Barcs
 Bácsalmás
 Bátonyterenye
 Berettyóújfalu
 Békés
 Békéscsaba (2x)
Temető Sor 1/1
Berényi Út 14.
 Biatorbágy
 Bonyhád
 Budapest (24x)
III. Huszti Út 36.
III. Pacsirtamező U. 41-43.
III. Pünkösdfürdő U. 52-54.
IV. Baross Utca 6.
IV. Külső Szilágyi Út 4.
VI. Király Utca 82.
VII. Garay Tér 20.
VIII. József Krt. 45.
VIII. Hős U. 9.
VIII. Könyves K. Krt. 62-64.
X. Kolozsvári Utca 55.
X. Sibrik Miklós Út 23.
XI. Rétköz U. 1.
XIII. Véső Utca 11.
XIII. Váci Út 9-15.
XIII. Jász U. 105.
XIV. Füredi Út 37.
XV. Régi Fóti Út 66-68.
XVII. Pesti Út 16-18.
XVIII. Margó Tivadar U. 31. 
XVIII. Üllői Út 661.
XIX. Ady E. Út 32-40.
XX. Topánka U. 7.
XXI. Kossuth Lajos U. 69.
 Cegléd (2x)
Malomtószél 27.
Kőrösi Út 38.
 Celldömölk
 Csongrád
 Csurgó
 Csorna
 Dabas
 Debrecen (3x)
Péterfia U. 13-19.
Külső Szoboszlói Út 1.
Sámsoni Út 99.
 Derecske
 Dombóvár
 Dorog
 Dunakeszi
 Dunaföldvár
 Dunaújváros (2x)
Baracsi Út 5.
Kenyérgyári U. 2.
 Edelény
 Eger (2x)
Mátyás Király Út 139.
II. Rákóczi Ferenc U. 96.
 Enying
 Érd (2x)
Bajcsy-Zsilinszky Út 133-135.
Budai Út 24.
 Fehérgyarmat
 Gárdony
 Göd
 Gödöllő
 Gyál
 Gyomaendrőd
 Gyöngyös
 Győr (3x)
Tihanyi Árpád Út 89.
Gerence Út 29-31.
Szabadrév U. 20.
 Gyula
 Hajdúböszörmény
 Hajdúhadház
 Hajdúnánás
 Hajdúszoboszló
 Hatvan
 Heves
 Hódmezővásárhely
 Jászapáti
 Jászárokszállás
 Jászberény
 Kalocsa
 Kaposvár
 Kapuvár
 Karcag
 Kazincbarcika
 Kecskemét (3x)
Kossuth Krt. 60.
Kodály Zoltán Tér 8.
Tordai U. 2.
 Keszthely (2x)
Csapás Út 6.
Frech Miklós U. 1.
 Kisbér
 Kiskőrös
 Kiskunfélegyháza
 Kiskunmajsa
 Kistarcsa
 Kisújszállás
 Kisvárda
 Komárom
 Komló
 Körmend
 Kőszeg
 Kunhegyes
 Kunszentmárton
 Lajosmizse
 Lenti
 Makó
 Marcali
 Mátészalka
 Mezőberény
 Mezőkovácsháza
 Mezőtúr
 Miskolc (3x)
Ilona U.1.
Soltész Nagy Kálmán U. 40.
Andrássy Utca 65.
 Mohács
 Monor
 Mosonmagyaróvár
 Mór
 Nagyatád
 Nagykanizsa (2x)
Dózsa György Utca 160.
Kalmár U. 8.
 Nagykáta
 Nagykőrös
 Nyírbátor
 Nyíregyháza (3x)
Család U. 35.
László U. 10.
Állomás Tér 6.
 Orosháza
 Oroszlány
 Ózd
 Paks
 Pápa
 Pásztó
 Pécel
 Pécs (5x)
Zsolnay Vilmos U. 8.
Pécsváradi Út 1.
Megyeri Út 84.
Siklósi Út 68/A
Sztárai Mihály Út 4.
 Pilis
 Polgár
 Püspökladány
 Ráckeve
 Sajószentpéter
 Salgótarján
 Sarkad
 Sárbogárd
 Sárospatak
 Sárvár
 Sátoraljaújhely
 Siklós
 Siófok
 Sopron
 Szarvas
 Szeged (3x)
Makkosházi Krt. 27.
Víztorony Tér 3.
Dorozsmai Út 52/A.
 Szeghalom
 Szekszárd
 Szentes
 Szentgotthárd
 Szerencs
 Szécsény
 Székesfehérvár (2x)
Széchenyi U. 104.
Palotai Út 10.
 Szigethalom
 Szigetszentmiklós
 Szigetvár
 Szikszó
 Szolnok (2x)
Bolt Köz 2.
Széchenyi István Krt. 137.
 Szombathely (3x)
Gazdag Erzsi U. 12.
Körmendi Út 42-48.
Sárvár U. 1.
 Tapolca
 Tamási
 Tata
 Tatabánya (2x)
Ságvári Út 44.
Győri Út 35.
 Tolna
 Tiszaföldvár
 Tiszafüred
 Tiszakécske
 Tiszaújváros
 Tiszavasvári
 Tokaj
 Törökszentmiklós
 Tura
 Újfehértó
 Üllő
 Várpalota
 Vásárosnamény
 Vecsés
 Veszprém (3x)
Aulich Lajos Utca 1.
Csillag U. 22.
Dózsa György Tér 1.
 Zalaegerszeg (2x)
Köztársaság Útja 51.
Platán Sor 17/B.
 Zalaszentgrót
 Záhony
 Zirc

Supermarkets

Regional and local chains

Specialty chains

Consumer electronics

Culture and Multimedia

Drugstore chains

Furniture

IKEA

 Budaörs
 Budapest, Örs vezér tere
 Budapest, Soroksár

Kika

 Budaörs
 Budapest, Lehel út
 Budapest, Soroksár
 Debrecen
 Győr
 Pécs

Möbelix

 Budapest
 Debrecen
 Dunakeszi
 Győr
 Miskolc
 Savolya Park (Budapest)
 Szeged

mömax

 Budaörs
 Budapest, III.ker.
 Budapest, XVII.ker.
 Debrecen
 Győr
 Kecskemét
 Nyíregyháza
 Pécs
 Sopron
 Szeged

Hardware store chains

Bauhaus

 Dunakeszi
 Maglód
 Szigetszentmiklós

OBI

 Békéscsaba
 Budakalász
 Budaörs
 Budapest, M5 Soroksár
 Budapest, KÖKI Terminál
 Budapest, Fogarasi út
 Budapest, Savoya Park
 Budapest, Soroksári út
 Budapest, Újpest
 Dunaújváros
 Fót, M3
 Gyöngyös
 Győr
 Kaposvár
 Kecskemét
 Keszthely
 Miskolc
 Nagykanizsa
 Nyíregyháza
 Siófok
 Sopron
 Szeged
 Szekszárd
 Székesfehérvár
 Szolnok
 Tatabánya
 Veszprém

Praktiker

 Békéscsaba
 Budaörs
 Budapest, Bécsi út
 Budapest, M3
 Budapest, Mester utca
 Budapest, Váci út
 Debrecen
 Esztergom
 Győr
 Kaposvár
 Kecskemét
 Miskolc
 Nyíregyháza
 Pécs
 Szeged
 Székesfehérvár
 Szolnok
 Szombathely
 Vecsés
 Zalaegerszeg

Fashion

Former chains 
Arzenál
bauMax (1992–2015)
Billa (1999 –2002)
Bricostore (1999–2012)
Cora (1997–2012)
Csemege Julius Meinl ( –2001)
Interfruct (1990–2008)
Jééé
Kaiser's (1994–2011)
Match (2001–2013)
Plus (1992–2010)
Profi (1989–2012)
Super Közért

References 

Hungary
Supermarket